Hien may refer to:

 Hien (Netherlands), a village near Dodewaard
 Kawasaki Ki-61, a Japanese World War II aircraft
 Getter Robot Hien, a manga and fictional character
 Hien (character), a Japanese fictional character
 Strider Hien, a character from Strider 2
 Hien, a character from the Aero Fighters series

People with the given name
 Nguyen Thanh Hien, Vietnamese-Hungarian singer